William D. Lackey (December 8, 1870 – May 15, 1941) was a pitcher in Major League Baseball who played briefly during the  season. He was born in St. Albans, West Virginia. Formerly known as just Lackey, also is known as Bill William D., Bill Lackey or William Lackey. Batting side and throwing arm are unknown.
 
Lackey was a 19 years old amateur pitcher when he debuted with the Philadelphia Athletics of the American Association. On October 2, 1890 he made a relief appearance, giving up four runs (two earned) on one hit and three walks while striking out one in 2.0 innings of work. He posted a 9.00 ERA and did not have a decision. As a batter, he was hitless in his only at-bat, and never appeared in a major league game again.

Lackey died in Columbus, Ohio, at the age of 70 of coronary thrombosis.

References

External links
As William Lackey at:
Baseball Reference
Retrosheet
SABR
Others
Baseball Almanac - as Bill Lackey
The Baseball Page - as Lackey

 

Philadelphia Athletics (AA) players
19th-century baseball players
Major League Baseball pitchers
Baseball players from West Virginia
1870 births
1941 deaths
People from St. Albans, West Virginia